HMS Emerald was an  light cruiser of the Royal Navy. She was built by Armstrong at Newcastle-on-Tyne, with the keel being laid down on 23 September 1918. She was launched on 19 May 1920 and commissioned 14 January 1926.

History
Emerald went out to the East Indies, 4th Cruiser Squadron, on commissioning, finally returning home to pay off on 15 July 1933. On 1 March 1926 she arrived off Jeddah and was visited by Ibn Saud, who took tea with her captain and was presented with a clock by the captain and the wardroom officers. During her time in the far east she participated as part of a Royal Navy flotilla in the 1927 Nanking Incident, helping to protect British and other international citizens and business interests. On her return home she paid off to reserve.

Recommissioned for war service, she joined the 12th Cruiser Squadron on Northern Patrol duties in September 1939. However, the appearance of German raiders in the Atlantic resulted in  her transfer to Halifax in October to escort homeward-bound convoys, where she remained into 1940. During the early part of the war, until May 1940, her captain was the noted officer Augustus Agar, V.C. On 24 June 1940 Emerald departed Greenock carrying £58 million in gold, and reached Halifax on 1 July where the gold was transferred to a Canadian National Railway train for safe storage in Canada until the threat of German invasion of England had passed. Her sister ship  shipped another £10 million for Operation Fish.

In 1941 Emerald was transferred to the Indian Ocean, where she escorted troop convoys to the Middle East and stood by in the Persian Gulf during the operations in Iraq in April 1941. After Japan's entry into the war, in December 1941, Emerald joined the Eastern Fleet as part of the 'Fast Group', and in March 1942 was flagship.

For the period 30 December 1941 to 13 January 1942 HMS Emerald  was an escort for convoy DM 1. At 1000 on 30 December 1941, about 370 miles east of Mombasa, convoy WS12ZM (Malaya) (P&O's SS Narkunda, MV Aorangi, P&O's MV Sussex, and MS Abbekerk) detaches from convoys WS12ZA (Aden) and WS12ZB (Bombay), and with USS Mount Vernon and escort HMS Emerald form convoy DM 1 (Durban Malaya).
Convoy DM 1 reaches ‘Port T’ – Addu Atoll in the Maldives at 1000 on 4 January 1942. On 11 January 1942, the convoy passes through the Sunda Strait. On 12 January 1942, the convoy passes through the Bangka Strait. On 13 January 1942, convoy DM 1 arrives in Singapore 

In August 1942 the ship returned home to refit at Portsmouth, and did not return to service until early April 1943.

She rejoined the Eastern Fleet, 4th Cruiser Squadron, for escort duties, then returned home once more for the Invasion of Normandy, when she served with Force "K" in support of Gold Beach. By January 1945 Emerald had joined the reserve fleet and, in 1947, was allocated for ship target trials. As a result of these trials the ship foundered in Kames Bay, Rothesay, on 24 October, and was not refloated until 9 June 1948, after which she was docked, examined, and then handed over to BISCO on 23 June 1948 for breaking up. She was scrapped at Arnott Young (Troon, Scotland) where she arrived on 5 July 1948.

See also 
Augustus Agar

References

Bibliography
 
 
 
 
 
 
 
 
 Operation Fish, by Alfred Draper, General Publishing, Don Mills, Ontario, Canada, 1979

External links

 HMS Emerald at Uboat.net

 

Emerald-class cruisers
Ships built on the River Tyne
World War II cruisers of the United Kingdom
1920 ships
Ships built by Armstrong Whitworth